Elijah Brush (May 10, 1773 – December 14, 1813) was a lawyer and politician from Detroit, Michigan.

Early life
Elijah Brush was born in Bennington, Vermont in 1773, the son of Colonel Nathaniel Brush and Samantha Parker (d. 1789). Brush graduated from Dartmouth College and came to Detroit in 1798.

Career
Following Detroit's hand-over to American control, John Askin, a British subject, moved across the Detroit River to Canada, leaving behind his farm, "Private Claim #1," which was immediately adjacent to Detroit.

Public service
Elijah Brush was elected a trustee in 1803, appointed Lieutenant Colonel of the Territorial Militia in 1805, and appointed as mayor of the town of Detroit after Solomon Sibley's resignation in 1806. Brush also served as Treasurer of the Michigan Territory from 1806 to 1813, and from 1811 to 1814 served as United States Attorney.

In 1807, Brush was the counsel in the first case to test the right to hold slaves in Michigan, Denison v. Tucker.

During the War of 1812, British forces captured Detroit and Elijah Brush and other militia officers were taken prisoner. He was shipped to Toronto, but his brother-in-law, a British officer, procured his release, and Brush returned to Detroit in late 1813 when American troops retook the city.

Personal life
In 1802, Brush married Adelaide Askin (1783–1859), daughter of John Askin and sister of John Askin, both prominent fur traders. The couple had three sons and a daughter who survived their father:

 Edmund Askin Brush (1802–1877), who married Elizabeth Cass Hunt (1825–1913).
 Charles Andrew Brush (1804–1807), who died young.
 Charles Reuben Brush (1807–1849), who married Jane Cameron Forsyth (1809–1856).
 John Alfred Brush (1811/5–1870), a doctor.
 Archange "Semanthe" Brush (1813–1842), who married Charles Meredith.

Elijah and Adelaide moved onto Askin's farm, and in 1806 the Brushes purchased it for $6000 and it eventually became known as the Brush Farm. Brush, a careful administrator, increased the value of the farm and made his heirs wealthy. In the 1850s, Edmund Brush began developing sections of the property into the fashionable Brush Park; the streets Edmund, Alfred, Adelaide, and Brush were named after members of the family.

He died on December 14, 1813, shortly after the Americans retook Detroit.

References

External links

1773 births
1813 deaths
People from Bennington, Vermont
Mayors of Detroit
Politicians from Detroit
Dartmouth College alumni
American militiamen in the War of 1812
Northwest Territory officials
American militia officers
War of 1812 prisoners of war held by the United Kingdom
19th-century American politicians